Rick Loomis (August 24, 1946 – August 23, 2019) was an American game designer, most notable as the founder of game publisher Flying Buffalo, which he managed until his death.

Career

Early years
Richard F. Loomis was born and raised in Scottsdale, Arizona and attended Coronado High School. He served in the United States Army for three years starting in 1969, and was stationed at Fort Shafter in Oahu, Hawaii. He had discovered the wargame Gettysburg by Avalon Hill in a toystore, and in 1970 had invented a game called Nuclear Destruction which—unlike most tabletop games—included hidden movement; in January 1970, Loomis started sending mail to readers of The General who had advertised for play-by-mail (PBM) opponents, offering to moderate multiplayer Nuclear Destruction games. He soon had more than 200 players in multiple games, and asked fellow soldier Steve MacGregor to write a computer program to moderate the games; they began renting time on a computer near Fort Shafter, using the name Flying Buffalo devised by Loomis. In 1972, he was discharged from the Army and went to college part time, eventually earning an accounting degree from Arizona State University.

Founding Flying Buffalo
After leaving the military in 1972, Loomis and MacGregor incorporated their PBM company as Flying Buffalo, Inc., or FBI. Loomis and MacGregor pooled their savings to purchase a Raytheon 704 minicomputer to run PBM turns. Loomis claims to have been the first person ever to buy a computer solely to play games on it. According to Shannon Appelcline, The computer cost $14,000 and came with 4k of memory, a teletype input, and a tape reader and punch for mass storage. For years afterward games were saved as rolls of paper tape hung from nails on a wall.

Loomis acquired Nuclear War and began publishing it in 1972, soon becoming one of Flying Buffalo's best sellers.

Ken St. Andre asked Loomis to take 40 copies of Tunnels & Trolls to Origins in July 1975 to sell; when every copy sold, Flying Buffalo picked up the rights to T&T later that year and published a second edition under their own brand in December 1975. After a friend suggested that someone should make a dungeon adventure book that allows the player to choose an answer and turn to another page, Loomis wrote Buffalo Castle (1976). Buffalo Castle was an introduction to Tunnels & Trolls, a basic dungeon for a warrior of level 1-2. Loomis came up with the idea for Grimtooth's Traps, which was published in 1981.

Loomis designed the Origins Award-winning play-by-mail game Starweb (1976). Nuclear Escalation, a card game released in 1983, had been the subject of a potential ban on all war related toys when two MPs of the UK Labour Party called the game "a nasty twist on the toy industry".  Loomis was interviewed as part of this discussion saying "the game is intended to be humorous ... the subject is so serious that you have to laugh about it because otherwise you'd cry."

When the company's lease on their headquarters ran out in 1985, Loomis moved the offices of Flying Buffalo to a farmhouse he had inherited in Scottsdale, Arizona. Also in 1985, Loomis tied for first place for "Best PBM Moderator" with Mike Williams (of Rebel Enterprises) in the 1st Annual Paper Mayhem Awards in the November/December 1985 issue of Paper Mayhem.

On August 19, 1978, Loomis was elected as a temporary officer to be the President and Treasurer of the Association of Game Manufacturers (which soon became the Game Manufacturers Association or GAMA). He was one of the founding members of GAMA and served as its President on multiple occasions. He was one of the few remaining Emeritus Directors (alongside Will Niebling and Michael Stackpole) on the board.

He was also one of only six people who had attended every Origins Game Fair since its founding in 1975. In 1988 Loomis received the AAGAD Hall of Fame award at the Origins Game Fair.

Later years
In 2002, Flying Buffalo published The Origins Metagame for the Origins convention, and Loomis later printed Poker decks for the con. When it was discovered that Outlaw Press, who were publishing supplements for T&T, had been using art without permission, Loomis revoked their T&T license.

In 2013, Flying Buffalo announced a new version of Tunnels & Trolls. This Deluxe version was done as a Kickstarter (which earned over $125,000) and was released in 2015. This new edition brought a lot of new interest in T&T and many of the old products as well as new adventures have been published in the ensuing years. Rick Loomis oversaw all the logistics and was the publisher of these new products. He also wrote a new section for his solo Buffalo Castle that was added to the deluxe version of that adventure.

In 2015, Flying Buffalo announced the Kickstarter for the 50th Anniversary edition Nuclear War Card Game. That Kickstarter earned over $156,000 and the 50th edition was released in 2016 and contained a new population deck and a couple of additional cards (designed by Rick) added to the main deck.

In March 2019 Flying Buffalo announced the kickstarter for the Combined Edition of Mercenaries, Spies and Private Eyes. It combined the text of the 1983 Flying Buffalo edition with the additional text of the 1986 Sleuth edition, corrected errata, and added 20 new pages of content with new illustrations. It earned $31,904 (over a goal of $10,000) and had 886 backers.

Health and death 
In January 2019 Loomis was diagnosed with lymphatic cancer. In an email he said that he was very optimistic as his cancer was "very treatable". On August 17, he was moved to the intensive care unit and could not receive visitors until August 21. A GoFundMe page and a Bundle of Holding offer (Catalyst 2019) were set up to solicit donations for his medical bills. On August 23, 2019, a day before his 73rd birthday, he died of medical complications.

Bibliography
 Provides details on Loomis's military service and transition founding Flying Buffalo Inc. .

Notes

References

1946 births
2019 deaths
American game designers
Arizona State University alumni
People from Scottsdale, Arizona
United States Army soldiers